Gongyuan Subdistrict (公园街道) may refer to the following locations in the PRC:

 Gongyuan Subdistrict, Huainan, in Tianjia'an District, Huainan, Anhui
 Gongyuan Subdistrict, Liuzhou, in Chengzhong District, Liuzhou, Guangxi
 Gongyuan Subdistrict, Cangzhou, in Yunhe District, Cangzhou, Hebei
 Gongyuan Subdistrict, Yanji, in Yanji, Jilin
 Gongyuan Subdistrict, Zibo, in Zhangdian District, Zibo, Shandong